Heidenheim station is a railway station in the municipality of Heidenheim an der Brenz, located in the Heidenheim district in Baden-Württemberg, Germany.

References

External links

Railway stations in Baden-Württemberg
Buildings and structures in Heidenheim (district)